Palaver is a 1969 Belgian fantasy film directed by Emile Degelin. The film was entered into the 6th Moscow International Film Festival. The film was selected as the Belgian entry for the Best Foreign Language Film at the 42nd Academy Awards, but was not accepted as a nominee.

Cast
 Umberto Bettencourt
 Christie Dermie
 Marion Hänsel as Dorpsmeisje
 Jean Kabuta
 Arlette La Haye as Blank meisje
 Grégoire Mulimbi
 Jacques Mulongo

See also
 List of submissions to the 42nd Academy Awards for Best Foreign Language Film
 List of Belgian submissions for the Academy Award for Best Foreign Language Film

References

External links
 

1969 films
1960s fantasy films
1960s Dutch-language films
Belgian fantasy films
Films directed by Emile Degelin
Dutch-language Belgian films